Kirdar-E-Sardar (2017) is an Indian Punjabi action film starring Nav Bajwa and Neha Pawar. The film is directed by Jatinder Singh Jeetu and is written by kudrat pal, while it is produced by Happs Music in association with Ohri Productions Pvt Ltd. Co-Producer of this movie is Gurpreet Kaur Chadha. The music label for this movie is Yellow Music.

Special thanks to Gopy Pannu and Balvir Kaur.

Cast
 Nav Bajwa
 Neha Pawar
 K S Makhan
 Raza Murad
 Dolly Bindra
 Harpreet Singh Khehra
 Gurpreet Kaur Chadha
 Rana Jung Bahadar
 Deedar Gill
 Suvidha Duggal
 Barinder Dhapai
 Tehalpreet Singh 
 Mahabir Bhullar

References

External links
 Kirdar-E-Sardar | Official Trailer | Punjabi Movie | Nav Bajwa, Neha Pawar
 Production House
 Official Facebook

2017 films
Punjabi-language Indian films
2010s Punjabi-language films